Gunnar Johan Stålsett (born 10 February 1935, in Nordkapp) is a Norwegian theologian and politician. He was leader of the Centre Party 1977–1979, general secretary of the Lutheran World Federation 1985–1993 and bishop of Oslo, in the Church of Norway 1998–2005.

Early life 

Gunnar Stålsett was born in Repvåg to principal Johan Emil Stålsett and Alma Elisabeth Joki. He was one of eight children. When he was seven the family moved to Gildeskål. His parents were inspired by the Laestadian movement in Finnmark. After having completed school in Leknes he went to high school in Nordfjordeid where he graduated in 1953.

Theological career 

Stålsett is a graduate from MF Norwegian School of Theology in Oslo, and was awarded the qualification cand.theol. in 1961. He has worked as a minister and taught at the University of Oslo. He has also been a General Secretary of the Lutheran World Federation and a member of the Norwegian Nobel Committee until he was appointed to bishop in 1998. He stepped down from office on 28 February 2005. His predecessor was Andreas Aarflot, and he was succeeded in Office by Ole Christian Kvarme.

Stålsett has also had a political career. From 1972 to 1973, during the cabinet Korvald, he was appointed state secretary in the Ministry of Church Affairs and Education. He served as a deputy representative to the Norwegian Parliament from Oslo in during the term 1977–1981, and chaired the Centre Party from 1977 to 1979.

Awards
2013: Niwano Peace Prize
2021: Officers Cross of the Order of Merit of the Federal Republic of Germany

References

External links

Gunnar Stålsett, (in Norwegian) Norsk Biografisk Leksikon

1935 births
Living people
People from Nordkapp
Bishops of Oslo
Norwegian theologians
MF Norwegian School of Theology, Religion and Society alumni
Academic staff of the University of Oslo
20th-century Lutheran bishops
21st-century Lutheran bishops
Deputy members of the Storting
Norwegian state secretaries
Politicians from Oslo
Centre Party (Norway) politicians
Officers Crosses of the Order of Merit of the Federal Republic of Germany